The Land Before Time is a 1988 animated adventure drama film directed and produced by Don Bluth from a story by Judy Freudberg and Tony Geiss and a screenplay by Stu Krieger, and executive produced by Steven Spielberg, George Lucas, Kathleen Kennedy, and Frank Marshall. The film stars the voices of Gabriel Damon, Candace Hutson, Judith Barsi and Will Ryan with narration provided by Pat Hingle. It is the first film in The Land Before Time franchise.

Produced by Amblin Entertainment and Sullivan Bluth Studios, it features dinosaurs living in prehistoric times. The plot features a young Apatosaurus named Littlefoot, who ends up alone after his mother is attacked by a vicious carnivore and dies (Tyrannosaurus). Littlefoot flees famine and upheaval to search for the Great Valley, an area spared from devastation, where the adult dinosaurs have moved on to. On his journey, he meets four young companions: Cera, a Triceratops, Ducky, a Saurolophus, Petrie, a Pteranodon, and Spike, a Stegosaurus. The film explores issues of prejudice between the different species and the hardships they endure in their journey as they are guided by the spirit of Littlefoot's mother and forced to deal with a "sharptooth" (Tyrannosaurus). 

The Land Before Time is the only Don Bluth film of the 1980s in which Dom DeLuise did not participate (instead, he starred in Disney's Oliver & Company released that same day), and the only film in The Land Before Time series that is not a musical, as well as the only one to be released theatrically worldwide. It was also the last film that Bluth directed that was distributed by Universal Pictures.

The film was released by Universal on November 18, 1988, to generally positive reviews from critics and was a box office success, grossing $84.4 million. Its success, along with An American Tail and the 1988 live-action/animated film Who Framed Roger Rabbit led Spielberg to found his animation studio, Amblimation. The first film spawned a franchise with thirteen direct-to-video sequels, a television series, video games and merchandise, none of which had Bluth, Spielberg nor Lucas' involvement (though Amblin Entertainment was involved in the television series like it was for Fievel's American Tails). It is currently Don Bluth's third highest-grossing animated film, only behind Anastasia (1997) and An American Tail (1986).

Plot 
During the age of the dinosaurs, a massive famine forces several herds of dinosaurs to seek an oasis known as the Great Valley. Among these, a mother in a diminished "longneck" (Apatosaurus) herd gives birth to a single baby, named Littlefoot. Years later, Littlefoot encounters Cera, a "three-horn" (Triceratops), until her father intervenes and tells her that three-horns don't play with longnecks, whereupon Littlefoot's mother describes other kinds of dinosaurs, who only associate with their own species. That night, as Littlefoot follows a "hopper" (Triadobatrachus), he encounters Cera again, and they play together briefly until a large "sharptooth" (Tyrannosaurus) attacks them. Littlefoot's mother comes to their rescue, fending off their attacker by bashing it with her large tail and long neck, but is mortally wounded in the process. The large predator, rather than consume Littlefoot’s mother, leaves the scene. His mother does not die instantly, drifting in and out of consciousness. Littlefoot won’t leave her side, so she gives her son some words of advice about finding the Great Valley before she dies: "Littlefoot, let your heart guide you. It whispers, so listen closely." An earthquake swallows up the sharptooth and divides Littlefoot, Cera, and other dinosaurs from their herds; several die in the process. Confused and in grief, Littlefoot meets an old dinosaur named Rooter (who is also narrating the story), who consoles him. He is then guided by his mother's voice telling him to follow the sun to the Great Valley and pass several landmarks, such as a rock formation that resembles a Longneck and the "Mountains that Burn" (volcanoes).

Later, Littlefoot meets a "bigmouth" (Saurolophus) named Ducky and a "flyer" (Pteranodon) named Petrie, who accompany him on his journey. Cera, who is attempting to find her own kind, finds the unconscious sharptooth inside a ravine and inadvertently wakes him up. She escapes and bumps into Littlefoot, Ducky, and Petrie; she tells them that the sharptooth is alive and pursuing them, but Littlefoot does not believe her. As Cera describes her encounter, she accidentally flings Ducky in the direction of a lone hatching "spiketail" (Stegosaurus), whom Ducky names "Spike" and inducts into the group. Seeking the Great Valley, they discover a cluster of trees, which is abruptly depleted by a herd of longnecks. Searching for remaining growth, they discover a single leaf-bearing tree, and obtain food by stacking up atop each other and pulling it down. Cera remains aloof, but at nightfall, she and everyone else gravitate to Littlefoot's side for warmth and companionship.

The next morning, they are attacked by the sharptooth, but they manage to escape through a tunnel that is too small for him to follow. Beyond this, they discover the landmarks mentioned by Littlefoot's mother. Before the volcanic range, a clash between Littlefoot's intention to follow his mother's directions and Cera's strong-willed insistence on going a different way results in a fight breaking out between them that causes the others to follow Cera, forcing Littlefoot to continue alone. However, when Ducky and Spike become endangered by lava and Petrie gets stuck in a tar pit, Littlefoot returns to rescue them. Cera gets ambushed by a pack of "domeheads" (Pachycephalosaurus) who are also living in the Mountains that Burn; the rest of the group pose as a tar monster, scaring away the domeheads and frightening Cera. When she realizes who it really is, Cera angrily leaves the group. It is not long, however, before it becomes clear that her pride had been wounded, as Cera is reluctant to admit that her stubbornness and selfishness nearly put others in danger. Later, while crossing a pond, Petrie overhears the sharptooth nearby. The group devises a scheme to lure him to the pond and drown him in the deep side using a nearby boulder. During the ensuing struggle, a draft from the sharptooth's nostrils enables Petrie to fly for the first time.

The plan nearly fails when the sharptooth begins attacking the boulder while the group attempts to push it onto him. However, Cera, having finally overcome her sorrow, reunites with the group and headbutts the boulder, causing the sharptooth to fall into the water below, the boulder crashing into him in the process. The sharptooth momentarily takes Petrie down with him, seemingly to his death, but Petrie later emerges unharmed. Littlefoot, alone, follows a cloud resembling his mother, which guides him to the Great Valley. He is then joined by the others. Upon arrival, the five are reunited with their families: Petrie impresses his family with his newfound flight; Ducky introduces Spike to her family, who adopt him; Cera reunites with her father; and Littlefoot finds his grandparents. The group then rejoins at the top of a hill and embrace each other in a loving hug.

Cast 

 Gabriel Damon as Littlefoot
 Candace Hutson as Cera
 Judith Barsi as Ducky
 Will Ryan as Petrie
 Helen Shaver as Littlefoot's mother
 Burke Byrnes as Cera's father
 Bill Erwin as Littlefoot's grandfather
 Pat Hingle as Narrator and Rooter

Production

Development 
During production of An American Tail, talk began of the next feature with Bluth and executive producer Steven Spielberg. Bluth and Spielberg wanted to do a film similar to Bambi, but with dinosaurs. Steven Spielberg's longtime friend George Lucas was also brought in on the project after being interested with it. The three persuaded An American Tail writers Judy Freudberg and Tony Geiss (both of whom were also prominent writers for Sesame Street) to write the screenplay for the film. Their initial draft was based on their early ideas, but when it was felt the story was too juvenile, Stu Krieger was brought on to revise their draft. Early into story development, the film was about a group of young dinosaurs looking for a wise, older dinosaur. Later on, Bluth explained, "...we came up with another idea that none of these dinosaurs get along with each other, they all hate each other. They're taught from the time they were born not to associate with each other, that's racism." An early working title for the film was The Land Before Time Began. Bluth, Spielberg and Lucas originally wanted the film to have no dialogue, like The Rite of Spring sequence in Fantasia, but the idea was abandoned in favor of using voice actors in order to make it appealing to children.

Animation 
As work on the script continued, Bluth delegated some of the animation staff to begin creating concept art. As with his previous films, Bluth handled the storyboarding, but with final revisions by Larry Leker. Production was initially delayed by several months as the studio moved to Ireland. Production would eventually begin in spring 1987, a few months after the release of An American Tail.

The production was preceded by extensive research, including visits to natural history museums in New York, Chicago, Los Angeles, and the Smithsonian Institution, Washington, DC. Skeletons, fossils, and paleoart from the turn of the century were consulted to help create a credible landscape and animals. Further research was conducted using live-action footage of quadrupedal modern animals, including elephants and giraffes.

Editing 
Late into production, The Land Before Time underwent a severe cutting and editing of footage. Spielberg and Lucas thought that some scenes in the movie would appear too dark and intense for young children. At a screening in Soho Square, London in late April 1988, six months before the film was completed, Spielberg told Bluth while looking at the scenes from the film, "It's too scary. We'll have kids crying in the lobby, and a lot of angry parents. You don't want that." A total of 19 fully animated shots from the sharptooth attack were cut from the final film, to attain a G rating instead of a PG rating. Examples can be seen in the storyboards of the chase sequence in the briar patch. POV shots of sharptooth's snapping jaws were deleted, and shots were rearranged to shorten the sequence. This results in continuity errors, depicting the Tyrannosaur with his right eye still open after it had been blinded. 

Perhaps just weeks before the film's release, more than 10 additional minutes of footage was cut from the film by Spielberg "to be sure it would not disturb parents or their children", according to producer Gary Goldman, reducing the runtime from 80 to 82 minutes to just 69 minutes. Much of the cut footage also consisted of sequences of the five young dinosaurs in grave danger and distress. An extended scene involving the introduction of Spike was deleted, as was some of the "Green Food" sequence. Petrie's apparent death scene originally went longer, and was followed by a group hug where Littlefoot says "Now we'll always be together." (this line survives in the form of a Pizza Hut promotional advertisement for the film). The film's final act was also heavily altered and rearranged; originally, Littlefoot was to find the Great Valley on his own before turning back to rescue his friends, kill sharptooth, and enter the valley as a group. This ending survives in multiple book adaptations, and the music accompanying it still exists in the official soundtrack release. Some screams were re-voiced using milder exclamations. The scenes are believed to be destroyed, but some did make it into multiple advertisements and trailers created before the release of the film, and multiple stills can be found in storybook adaptations and press kits for the movie. Much of the unused music from the film score was meant to play over the deleted scenes. Many animation cels and drawings from the deleted scenes have surfaced on the internet.

Music 

The music for The Land Before Time was composed by James Horner, who had previously provided the soundtrack for An American Tail, and performed by the London Symphony Orchestra and the Choir of King's College. An official soundtrack was released on audio cassette and vinyl record on November 21, 1988, and later on CD by MCA Records, and features seven tracks from the movie. The film's theme song "If We Hold on Together", written by Horner and Will Jennings, was sung by Diana Ross and was released as the soundtrack's lead and only single on November 5, 1988, peaking at number 23 on the US adult contemporary charts, and was later included on her 1991 album The Force Behind the Power. A digital version of the soundtrack was released on a number of services on January 22, 2013 by Geffen Records.

An expanded version of the soundtrack album was released by Intrada Records on October 27, 2020. This release featured newly remastered versions of the music on the original album, as well as 15 minutes of previously unreleased material.

Release 
The Land Before Time opened on November 18, 1988. Attached to the film, Universal and Amblin issued Brad Bird's Family Dog short from their television anthology Amazing Stories.

Reception

Box office 
During its opening weekend, the film opened at number one in the United States and Canada, grossing $7.5 million. By the end of its theatrical run, it had grossed $48.1 million at the US box office, slightly more than Don Bluth's previous film, An American Tail, but $5 million less than Oliver & Company which was released at the same time. Overall, The Land Before Time grossed $84.5 million worldwide.

Critical response 
The Land Before Time holds  "fresh" approval rating from review aggregator site Rotten Tomatoes from  critics, with the consensus: "Beautifully animated and genuinely endearing, The Land Before Time is sure to please dino-obsessed tykes, even if it's a little too cutesy for older viewers." Metacritic assigned a score of 66, based on reviews by 15 critics, signifying "Generally favorable reviews".

Critics Gene Siskel and Roger Ebert gave the film "two thumbs up" on a November 19, 1988, episode of their television program At the Movies. Siskel found it to be "sweet more than it was scary" and "quite beautiful", also praising its straightforward story and remarked that he would recommend it to children over Disney's Oliver and Company, released the same day. In his own review for the Chicago Sun-Times, Ebert gave the film three out of four stars, writing "I guess I sort of liked the film, although I wonder why it couldn't have spent more time on natural history and the sense of discovery, and less time on tragedy." Peter Travers of People magazine felt the movie had an unclear audience, stating "The animation is fine. But the Stu Krieger screenplay contains violence that might be hard on the younger ones, [...] and a never-let-up cuteness that can turn minds of all ages to mush." Los Angeles Times writer Sheila Benson also stated that the movie's enjoyment was limited to younger viewers, remarking "do dinosaurs really lend themselves to ootsie-cutesiness?" Hal Hinson of The Washington Post wrote "though it's not a great film, it is an entertaining and, at times, emotionally rich one."

Many reviewers compared The Land Before Time to films from Disney's Golden Age. Steven Rea of the Philadelphia Inquirer said that the movie "looks and sounds as if it came out of the Disney Studios of the '40s or '50s. Which isn't necessarily a bad thing," calling it "meticulously crafted" but was also "mildly disappoint[ed]" that the dialog wasn't as sophisticated. In her review for the Sun-Sentinel, Candice Russel similarly remarked, "The Land Before Time works by evoking the simple virtues of this art aimed at children, as it was in the beginning when Disney animated Mickey Mouse." A review from the Motion Picture Guide 1989 Annual notes that the film "has been called a sort of prehistoric Bambi". David Kehr from the Chicago Tribune similarly felt that the film's title "also refers to the Disney past, but it goes for all the marbles. Its model is nothing less than the life-cycle saga of Bambi, and that Bluth gets even half the way there is proof of a major talent." Kehr gave the movie three-and-a-half out of four stars, calling it "as handsome and honest an animated feature as any produced since Walt Disney's death; it may even be the best."

Don Bluth's membership in the Church of Jesus Christ of Latter-day Saints influenced the themes of the film. In an interview with Church News, he stated: "Everything I do is centered around the gospel. Even our films are, although the secular world would never realize it." Randy Astle states that Littlefoot can be read as a Christ figure because of his special birth circumstances and position as a leader of his people. Littlefoot does not undergo crucifixion or resurrection, making other typological interpretations more persuasive. The journey to the Great Valley, which is to the west, mirrors that of the Mormon pioneers, who moved from fertile lands in the east to the arid and mountainous great basin. Astle concludes that "Littlefoot is both a Joseph Smith—he sees a pillar of light and receives heavenly visitors—and a Brigham Young–he leads his followers across the plains."

Accolades 
The Land Before Time was nominated for "Best Family Animation or Fantasy Motion Picture" at the 10th annual Youth in Film Awards, losing out to Tim Burton's Beetlejuice. It also received a nomination for "Best Fantasy Film" at the 16th Saturn Awards ceremony in 1990, beaten by Who Framed Roger Rabbit.

Home media 
The Land Before Time was released on VHS on September 14, 1989, November 22, 1991, as well as LaserDisc in regular pan and scan and "Special Collector's Edition" CAV-play editions by MCA/Universal Home Video in North America, and CIC Video internationally. According to the book The Animated Films of Don Bluth, the original release did "very successful business" on the home video market, and included a promotional tie-in with Pizza Hut in North America, which was offering rubber hand puppets based on the film at the time. Pizza Hut also ran its partnership with the film's VHS release in Australia. The VHS version was made available once more on February 20, 1996, under the Universal Family Features label, and was later packaged with following three films in the series as part of the Land Before Time Collection on December 4, 2001.

The film was released on DVD for the first time on April 30, 1997, and re-released on December 2, 2003, as the "Anniversary Edition" for the movie's 15th anniversary, which included games and sing-along songs. The Anniversary Edition was later included with An American Tail and Balto as a three-movie pack in November 2007. A widescreen Blu-ray version was available for the first time on October 13, 2015, which included digital HD and UltraViolet copies, which was accompanied by a new widescreen DVD release on the same day. The Blu-ray was re-released on January 15, 2019.

Legacy 

The film generated 13 direct-to-video sequels, which differ from the original by adding "sing-along" musical numbers. Bluth, Spielberg, and Lucas have no affiliation with any of the film's sequels. The sequels have generally been met with mixed reception: many fans of the original disregarded the sequels, while others have embraced the sequels into the canon of the story.

In 2007, a television series was released in North America. It follows the style of the sequels in terms of the morality and the musical numbers (with some of the songs being shortened, and reworked).

References

Bibliography

External links 

 
 
 
 
 
 

The Land Before Time films
1988 films
1988 animated films
1980s adventure drama films
1980s children's adventure films
1980s American animated films
1980s buddy drama films
1988 drama films
Amblin Entertainment films
Amblin Entertainment animated films
American children's animated adventure films
American children's animated drama films
American buddy drama films
Irish animated films
American coming-of-age drama films
American adventure drama films
Animated buddy films
Animated coming-of-age films
Films about dinosaurs
Animated films about dinosaurs
Films about earthquakes
Films about famine
Films adapted into television shows
Films directed by Don Bluth
Films scored by James Horner
Films produced by Don Bluth and Gary Goldman
Films produced by John Pomeroy
Lucasfilm films
Lucasfilm animated films
American drama road movies
Rotoscoped films
Sullivan Bluth Studios films
Universal Pictures films
Universal Pictures animated films
1980s children's animated films
Animated films about friendship
1980s English-language films
Irish children's films